Teraco Data Environments is a carrier-, cloud- and vendor-neutral data centre provider founded by Tim Parsonson and Lex van Wyk in 2008. On August 1, 2022, Digital Realty announced that it had completed the purchase of a majority stake in Teraco, previously controlled by Berkshire Partners, Permira and a group of investors.

Overview
As the local telecommunications market began to deregulate, Teraco's founders recognised an opportunity for a truly vendor-neutral data centre offering in South Africa.

The possibility of providing a service that was not tied to any carrier or ISP became not only technically feasible and economically viable, but increasingly desirable to South African enterprises that needed unrestricted choice in how they interconnected their facilities and connected to the internet.

Teraco has brought international best practices in vendor-neutral data centre management to South Africa to give businesses a technically superior, physically safer, and lower-cost environment for their information systems. Teraco manages colocation data centres in Johannesburg, Cape Town, and Durban.

As Africa's leading carrier-neutral colocation provider, Teraco is the first provider of highly resilient, vendor-neutral data environments in sub-Saharan Africa. With its world-class data centre infrastructure and network-dense ecosystems, Teraco forms a vital part of the African internet's backbone and is essential to the modern enterprise's digital transformation strategy. Purpose-built and operated to global best practice by an organisation with an absolute focus on data centre technology and infrastructure, Teraco offers its clients secure, cost-effective, sustainable, scalable, and resilient data centre services.

Its ever-expanding ecosystems move Teraco beyond colocation and establish it as an open marketplace for digital growth and innovation. Discovering new business partners, making strategic interconnection choices, on-ramping to a choice of cloud providers, and reaching new markets globally, Teraco provides a highly secure, flexible, and resilient home for digital organisations across the world.

Teraco is part-owned by Digital Realty (NYSE: DLR) - offering customers a global data centre platform designed to enable digital business to scale within a highly connected data community across >285 data centres in 50 metros and 26 countries on six continents - and a consortium of private equity investors, including Berkshire Partners LLC and Permira. Teraco is a Level 2 BBBEE contributor (DTI Codes).

Data centres 
Teraco built Africa's largest data centre in Johannesburg, South Africa. In 2012, the company created NAPAfrica, a fully funded non-profit neutral Internet eXchange Point (IXP). Teraco has additional data centres in Durban and Cape Town.

Peering by NAPAfrica 
Xneelo, South Africa's web hosting company, partnered with this company. Telkom peered with NAPAfrica through its Openserve wholesale and network division in 2016. Clients will be able to use the Microsoft service through this company. The telecom operator, Angola Cables, peered with this company in 2017.

Accomplishments and funding 
After completing an Environmental Impact Assessment, Teraco was granted permission to store 210,000 litres of diesel on site.

2011: The company received R158 million in Series C financing.

2013: A R200 million medium-term funding facility was provided from Absa's corporate and investment banking division.

2014: Teraco is acquired by Permira in first African investment.

2015: The company acquired R400 million in funding.

2016: Liquid Telecom invested $3.5 million in a new satellite hub.

2017: Barclays Africa Group funded R1.2 billion ($90 million) for Teraco Data Environments.

2022: Digital Realty acquires 55% stake in Teraco Data Environments

References 

Companies based in Johannesburg
Information technology companies of South Africa
2022 mergers and acquisitions